{{safesubst:#invoke:RfD|||month = March
|day = 18
|year = 2023
|time = 23:49
|timestamp = 20230318234900

|content=
REDIRECT Blu-ray

}}